Cantarell Field or Cantarell Complex is an supergiant offshore oil field in Mexico. It was discovered in 1976 after oil stains were noticed by a fisherman, Rudesindo Cantarell Jimenez, in 1972. In terms of cumulative production to date, it was  the largest oil field in Mexico, and one of the largest in the world. In 2009 it was superseded by Ku-Maloob-Zaap as Mexico's largest oil field.

Location
This complex comprises four major fields: Akal (by far the largest), Nohoch, Chac and Kutz. The reservoirs are formed from carbonate breccia of Late Cretaceous age, the rubble from the asteroid impact that created the Chicxulub Crater. The recently discovered Sihil field (1-15,000 million barrels) contains light oil in Jurassic strata below the other reservoirs and is generally referred to as a separate field, although its development will obviously benefit from the infrastructure already in place above it. Cantarell's oil production peaked in 2004 and has declined in subsequent years, with further decline expected in the future.

Geology
The Chicxulub impactor produced the Chicxulub crater and subsequent carbonate-debris breccia, which became the oil reservoir for the fields around Villahermosa and the Bay of Campeche where the Cantarell Complex is located.
The porosity is 8%-12% in the reservoir at a depth of about 1500 m, which grades from being coarse-grained to fine-grained, called Unit 1 and 2 respectively, and overlain by a seal of shaly ejecta-rich layer called Unit 3.

Following impact, the carbonate platform collapsed, depositing the coarse breccias, which were then overlain mixed and overlain by finer breccias from the consequent tsunamis.  Folding occurred in the early Miocene to Pliocene and the compression forced up Cretaceous and Upper Jurassic blocks forming the Structural trap in which hydrocarbons migrated in the Miocene.  There are four blocks in the Cantarell Complex, Akal, Nohoch, Chac and Kutz with the Akal block underlain by a fifth block, Sihil, where oil was discovered in 1998.

Production History

By 1981 the Cantarell complex was producing . However, Cantarell had much smaller oil reserves than Ghawar, so production began to decline rapidly in the second half of the decade. Unfortunately, the nitrogen has migrated into the gas, lowering its heating value and thus, economic value, and soon will require treatment to remove the nitrogen from the gas, to be able to use the gas as a fuel.

Luis Ramírez Corzo, head of PEMEX's exploration and production division, announced on August 12, 2004 that the actual oil output from Cantarell was forecast to decline steeply from 2006 onwards, at a rate of 14% per year. In March 2006 it was reported that Cantarell had already peaked, with a second year of declining production in 2005. For 2006, the field's output declined by 13.1%, according to Jesús Reyes Heróles, the director-general of PEMEX.

Analysts theorize that this rapid decline is a result of production enhancement techniques causing faster short-term oil extraction at the expense of field longevity.

By September 2009 this figure was already achieved, marking one of the most dramatic declines ever seen in the oil industry. The shortfall had a negative effect on Mexico's annual government budget and sovereign-credit rating. Production continued to decline and production was at 340,000 barrels per day in June 2014. Pemex planned to spend 6 billion US dollars until 2017 to stop the decline and maintain production level at around 325,000 barrels per day for another decade. Production continued to decline, reaching 159,300 barrels per day in 2019.

In order to try to maintain heavy crude production in the Bay of Campeche, PEMEX was focusing its efforts on the development of the Ku-Maloob-Zaap complex in an adjacent area, which can be connected to the existing facilities of Cantarell. Ku-Maloob-Zaap complex is expected to produce  by the end of decade. In 2009, Ku-Maloob-Zaap replaced Cantarell as Mexico's most productive oil field.

See also

 List of oil fields
 Petroleum industry in Mexico

References

External links
Peak Oil is Now Official by Trey Shaughnessy, 18 March 2006.
Mexico Oil Production going down January 2007
Cantarell main data
Rigzone Article on Decline
Cantarell is Dying (Article)

Oil fields in Mexico
Petroleum industry in the Gulf of Mexico
Pemex